Wisarut Pannasri (born June 13, 1982) is a Thai retired professional footballer who played as a left back.

Honours

Club
Muangthong United
 Thai Premier League (1): 2009

External links

1982 births
Living people
Wisarut Pannasri
Wisarut Pannasri
Association football fullbacks
Wisarut Pannasri
Wisarut Pannasri
Wisarut Pannasri
Wisarut Pannasri
Wisarut Pannasri
Wisarut Pannasri
Wisarut Pannasri
Wisarut Pannasri
Wisarut Pannasri
Wisarut Pannasri
Wisarut Pannasri
Wisarut Pannasri